Lula Barbosa da Silva (born March 13, 1970 in Recife) is a beach volleyball player from Brazil, who won the silver medal in the men's beach team competition at the 1999 Pan American Games in Winnipeg, Manitoba, Canada, partnering Adriano Garrido.

References

1970 births
Living people
Brazilian men's beach volleyball players
Beach volleyball players at the 1999 Pan American Games
Pan American Games silver medalists for Brazil
Pan American Games medalists in volleyball
Medalists at the 1999 Pan American Games
Sportspeople from Recife
20th-century Brazilian people